Darreh Khunbazi Dam-e Saqaveh (also Romanized as Darreh Khūnbāzī Dam-e Saqāveh) is a village in Margown Rural District, Margown District, Boyer-Ahmad County, Kohgiluyeh and Boyer-Ahmad Province, Iran. At the 2006 census, its population was 20, in 5 families.

References 

Populated places in Boyer-Ahmad County